Halls Hill is a place about 20 kilometres northeast of Sackville, New Brunswick, Canada.

History

Notable people

See also
List of communities in New Brunswick

References

Communities in Westmorland County, New Brunswick